Tatjana Burmazovic (Serbian Cyrillic: Татјана Бурмазовић; February 6, 1984) is a Serbian volleyball player, playing on a position of libero, born in Sremska Mitrovica, Serbia. She was voted best cadet in Yugoslavia in 2000, best libero in Yugoslavia in 2002 and best beach volley player in 2006. Her career includes playing both as a volleyball and a beach volleyball player. She was a member of Serbian junior national team for 3 years, and a member of Serbian beach volleyball national team for 8 years. In 2002 - 2003 with volleyball team SREM, she participated in CEV CUP. In 2003 - 2004 with OK Crvena Zvezda, she participated in Indesit European Champions League. And in 2007 - 2008 with Béziers Volley, she participated in CEV Challenge Cup.

References
1. LNV profile

2. CEV profile

3. http://www.volleyballnantes.com/ Internet page of her current club]

Achievements
 Serbian Volleyball League
 Winner 2003 - 2004
 Serbian Cup
 Winner 2003 - 2004
 Bulgarian Volleyball League
 Winner 2006 - 2007
 French Cup
 Finalist 2018-2019
 French Volleyball League
 Finalist 2018-2019

1984 births
Living people
Serbian women's volleyball players
Serbian expatriate sportspeople in Bosnia and Herzegovina
Serbian expatriate sportspeople in Bulgaria
Serbian expatriate sportspeople in France